The Black Sea Fiber-Optic Cable System (BSFOCS) is a  submarine telecommunications cable system linking three countries bordering the Black Sea.  It went into operation in September 2001, and has a total capacity of 20 Gbit/s along 2 fiber pairs.

It has landing points in:
Varna, Bulgaria
Odessa, Ukraine
Novorossiysk, Russia

References
https://web.archive.org/web/20070930122255/http://foptnet.ge/map2eng.htm Map of the cable system (3 Systems BSFOCS, KAFOS, & ITUR)

Notes

Submarine communications cables in the Black Sea
Bulgaria–Russia relations
Russia–Ukraine relations
Bulgaria–Ukraine relations
Internet in Bulgaria
2001 establishments in Bulgaria
2001 establishments in Russia
2001 establishments in Ukraine